Cheonggyesan Station is a railway station in Seoul, South Korea, on the Seoul Metropolitan Subway-operated Shinbundang Line. It opened on October 28, 2011.

There is a light display between Cheonggysean Station and Pangyo Station.

Station layout

Exits
Two exits:
 East side of Cheonggyesan-ro
 West side of Cheonggyesan-ro

References

Seoul Metropolitan Subway stations
Railway stations opened in 2011
Metro stations in Seocho District